Hiebert is a surname. Notable people with the surname include:

Augie Hiebert (1916–2007), American television executive
Christine Hiebert (born 1960), Swiss-born American artist known for her drawing
Cornelius Hiebert (born 1862), Canadian politician
Jake Hiebert (born 1963), Canadian songwriter and musician also known as Big Rude Jake
Paul Hiebert (1932–2007), American missiologist
Paul Hiebert (1892–1987), Canadian writer and humorist
Russ Hiebert (born 1969), Canadian politician

Russian Mennonite surnames